Matetsky is a surname. It's an English-language form of Russian name Матецкий. Notable people with the surname include:

Ira Brad Matetsky (born 1962), American lawyer and Wikipedian
Vladimir Matetsky (born 1952), Russian composer

Polish writing of the name is Matecki
Teodor Teofil Matecki